Maciej Wolski (born 29 March 1997) is a Polish professional footballer who plays for Stal Mielec.

References

Polish footballers
1997 births
Living people
Association football midfielders
Lechia Gdańsk II players
Lechia Gdańsk players
Olimpia Grudziądz players
ŁKS Łódź players
Stal Mielec players
Ekstraklasa players
I liga players
II liga players
III liga players